In optics, a Rayleigh interferometer is a type of interferometer which employs two beams of light from a single source.  The two beams are recombined after traversing two optical paths, and the interference pattern after recombination allows the determination of the difference in path lengths.

Principle of Operation 

Light from a source (left) is collimated by a lens and split into two beams using slits. The beams are sent through two different paths and pass through compensating plates. They are brought to a focus by a second lens (bottom) where an interference pattern is observed to determine the optical path difference in terms of wavelengths of the light.

Advantages and disadvantages
The advantage of the Rayleigh interferometer is its simple construction. Its drawbacks are (i) it requires a point or line source of light for good fringe visibility, and (ii) the fringes must be viewed with high magnification.

See also
List of types of interferometers

References

Interferometers